is one of the major schools of Buddhism in Japan and one of the few surviving Vajrayana lineages in East Asia, originally spread from India to China through traveling monks such as Vajrabodhi and Amoghavajra.

Known in Chinese as the Tangmi (the Esoteric School in the Tang dynasty of China), these esoteric teachings would later flourish in Japan under the auspices of a Buddhist monk named Kūkai, who traveled to Tang China to acquire and request transmission of the esoteric teachings. For that reason, it is often called Japanese Esoteric Buddhism, or Orthodox Esoteric Buddhism.

The word shingon is the Japanese reading of the Chinese word , which is the translation of the Sanskrit word  ("mantra").

History 

Shingon Buddhist doctrine and teachings arose during the Heian period (794-1185) after a Buddhist monk named Kūkai traveled to China in 804 to study Esoteric Buddhist practices in the city of Xi'an, then called Chang-an, at Azure Dragon Temple under Huiguo, a favourite student of the legendary Amoghavajra. Huiguo was the first person to gather the still scattered elements of Indian and Chinese Esoteric Buddhism into a cohesive system, and Esoteric Buddhism was not yet considered to be a different sect or school at that time. Kūkai returned to Japan as Huiguo's lineage- and Dharma-successor.

Kūkai's early esoteric practices 
Before he went to China, Kūkai had been an independent monk in Japan for over a decade. He was extremely well versed in Chinese literature, calligraphy and Buddhist texts. When Kūkai was 22, he learned this mantra from Gonsō and regularly would go into the forests of Shikoku to practice it for long periods of time. He persevered in this mantra practice for seven years and mastered it. According to tradition, this practice brought him siddhis of superhuman memory retention and learning ability. Kūkai would later praise the power and efficacy of Kokuzō-Gumonjiho practice, crediting it with enabling him to remember all of Huiguo's teachings in only three months. Kūkai's respect for Ākāśagarbha was so great that he regarded him as his  for the rest of his life.

It was also during this period of intense mantra practice that Kūkai dreamt of a man telling him to seek out the Mahavairocana Tantra for the doctrine that he sought. The Mahavairocana Tantra had only recently been made available in Japan. He was able to obtain a copy in Chinese but large portions were in Sanskrit in the Siddhaṃ script, which he did not know, and even the Chinese portions were too arcane for him to understand. He believed that this teaching was a door to the truth he sought, but he was unable to fully comprehend it and no one in Japan could help him. Thus, Kūkai resolved to travel to China to spend the time necessary to fully understand the Mahavairocana Tantra.

Kūkai's studies in China 
When Kūkai reached China and first met Huiguo on the fifth month of 805, Huiguo was age sixty and on the verge of death from a long spate of illness. Huiguo exclaimed to Kūkai in Chinese (in paraphrase), "At last, you have come! I have been waiting for you! Quickly, prepare yourself for initiation into the mandalas!" Huiguo had foreseen that Esoteric Buddhism would not survive in India and China in the near future and that it was Kukai's destiny to see it continue in Japan. In the short space of three months, Huiguo initiated and taught Kūkai everything he knew on the doctrines and practices of the Mandala of the Two Realms as well as mastery of Sanskrit and (presumably to be able to communicate with Master Huiguo) Chinese. Huiguo declared Kūkai to be his final disciple and proclaimed him a Dharma successor, giving the lineage name Henjō-Kongō "All-Illuminating Vajra".

In the twelfth month of 805, Huiguo died and was buried next to his master, Amoghavajra. More than one thousand of his disciples gathered for his funeral. The honour of writing his funerary inscription on their behalf was given to Kūkai.

Kukai returned to Japan after Huiguo's death. If he had not, Shingon Esoteric Buddhism might not have survived; 35 years after Huiguo's death in the year 840, Emperor Wuzong of Tang assumed the throne. An avid Daoist, Wuzong despised Buddhism and considered the sangha useless tax-evaders. In 845, he ordered the destruction of 4600 vihara and 40,000 temples. Around 250,000 Buddhist monks and nuns had to give up their monastic lives. Wuzong stated that Buddhism was an alien religion and promoted Daoism zealously as the ethnic religion of the Han Chinese. Although Wuzong was soon assassinated by his own inner circle, the damage had been done. Chinese Buddhism, especially Esoteric practices, never fully recovered from the persecution, and esoteric elements were infused into other Buddhist sects and traditions.

After Kūkai's return to Japan 

After returning to Japan, Kūkai collated and systematized all that he had learned from Huiguo into a cohesive doctrine of pure esoteric Buddhism that would become the basis for his school. Kūkai did not establish his teachings as a separate school; it was Emperor Junna, who favoured Kūkai and Esoteric Buddhism, who coined the term  in an imperial decree which officially declared  in Kyoto an Esoteric temple that would perform official rites for the state. Kūkai actively took on disciples and offered transmission until his death in 835 at the age of 61.

This favour allotted Shingon several politically powerful temples in the capital, where rituals for the imperial family and nation were regularly performed.

Schism 

Through his connections he managed to gain the favour of high-ranking nobles in Kyoto, which helped him to be appointed abbot of Mount Kōya. The leadership at Kongōbuji, however, opposed the appointment on the premise that Kakuban had not originally been ordained on Mount Kōya.

After the death of Kakuban in 1143, the Negoro faction returned to Mount Kōya. However, in 1288, the conflict between Kongōbuji and the Denbō-in came to a head once again. Led by Raiyu, the Denbō-in priests once again left Mount Kōya, this time establishing their headquarters on Mount Negoro. This exodus marked the beginning of the Shingi Shingon School at Mount Negoro, which was the center of Shingi Shingon until it was sacked by daimyō  in 1585.

Lineage 

The Shingon lineage is an ancient transmission of esoteric Buddhist doctrine that began in India and then spread to China and Japan. Shingon is the name of this lineage in Japan, but there are also esoteric schools in China, Korea, Taiwan and Hong Kong that consider themselves part of this lineage (as the originators of the Esoteric teachings) and universally recognize Kūkai as their eighth patriarch. This is why sometimes the term "Orthodox Esoteric Buddhism" is used instead.

Shingon or Orthodox Esoteric Buddhism maintains that the expounder of the doctrine was originally the Universal Buddha Vairocana, but the first human to receive the doctrine was Nagarjuna in India. The tradition recognizes two groups of eight great patriarchs – one group of lineage holders and one group of great expounders of the doctrine.

 The Eight Great Lineage Patriarchs (Fuho-Hasso )

 Vairocana (Dainichi-Nyorai )
 Vajrasattva (Kongō-Satta )
 Nagarjuna (Ryūju-Bosatsu ) – received the Mahavairocana Tantra from Vajrasattva inside an Iron Stupa in Southern India
 Nagabodhi (Ryūchi-Bosatsu )
 Vajrabodhi (Kongōchi-Sanzō )
 Amoghavajra (Fukūkongō-Sanzō )
 Huiguo (Keika-Ajari )
 Kūkai (Kōbō-Daishi )

 The Eight Great Doctrine-Expounding Patriarchs (Denji-Hasso )

 Nagarjuna (Ryūju-Bosatsu )
 Nagabodhi (Ryūchi-Bosatsu )
 Vajrabodhi (Kongōchi-Sanzō )
 Amoghavajra (Fukūkongō-Sanzō )
 Śubhakarasiṃha (Zenmui-Sanzō )
 Yi Xing (Ichigyō-Zenji )
 Huiguo (Keika-Ajari )
 Kūkai (Kōbō-Daishi )

Doctrines

Tantra 
These are the four principal texts of Esoteric Buddhism and are all tantras, not sutras, despite their names.

The mystical Vairocana and Vajraśekhara Tantras are expressed in the two main mandalas of Shingon, the Mandala of the Two Realms – The Womb Realm mandala and the Diamond Realm mandala. These two mandalas are considered to be a compact expression of the entirety of the Dharma, and form the root of Buddhism. In Shingon temples, these two mandalas are always mounted one on each side of the central altar.

The Susiddhikara Sūtra is largely a compendium of rituals. Tantric Buddhism is concerned with the rituals and meditative practices that lead to enlightenment. According to Shingon doctrine, enlightenment is not a distant, foreign reality that can take aeons to approach but a real possibility within this very life, based on the spiritual potential of every living being, known generally as Buddha-nature. If cultivated, this luminous nature manifests as innate wisdom. With the help of a genuine teacher and through proper training of the body, speech, and mind, i.e. , one can reclaim and liberate this enlightened capacity for the benefit of oneself and others.

Kūkai systematized and categorized the teachings he inherited from Huiguo into ten bhūmis or "stages of spiritual realization".

Relationship to Vajrayāna 

When the teachings of Shingon Buddhism were brought to Japan, Esoteric Buddhism was still in its early stages in India. At this time, the terms Vajrayāna ("Diamond Vehicle") and Mantrayāna ("Mantra Vehicle") were not used for Esoteric Buddhist teachings. Instead, esoteric teachings were more typically referred to as Mantranaya, or the "Mantra System." According to Paul Williams, Mantranaya is the more appropriate term to describe the self-perception of early Esoteric Buddhism.

The primary difference between Shingon and Tibetan Buddhism is that there is no Inner Tantra or Anuttarayoga Tantra in Shingon. Shingon has what corresponds to the Kriyā, Caryā, and Yoga classes of tantras in Tibetan Buddhism. The Tibetan system of classifying tantras into four classes is not used in Shingon.
  
Anuttarayoga Tantras such as the Yamantaka Tantra, Hevajra Tantra, Mahamaya Tantra, Cakrasaṃvara Tantra, and the Kalachakra Tantra were developed at a later period of Esoteric Buddhism and are not used in Shingon.

Esoteric vs exoteric 
He wrote at length on the difference between exoteric, mainstream Mahayana Buddhism and esoteric Tantric Buddhism. The differences between exoteric and esoteric can be summarised:
Exoteric teachings are preached by the  Buddha, which in our world and aeon, is the historical  or one of the  Buddhas.
Exoteric Buddhism holds that the ultimate state of Buddhahood is ineffable, and that nothing can be said of it. Esoteric Buddhism holds that while nothing can be said of it verbally, it is readily communicated via esoteric rituals which involve the use of mantras, mudras, and mandalas.
Kūkai held that exoteric doctrines were merely upāya "skillful means" teachings on the part of the Buddhas to help beings according to their capacity to understand the Truth. The esoteric doctrines, in comparison, are the Truth itself and are a direct communication of the inner experience of the Dharmakaya's enlightenment. When Gautama Buddha attained enlightenment in his earthly Nirmanakaya, he realized that the Dharmakaya is actually reality in its totality and that totality is Vairocana.
Some exoteric schools in the late Nara and early Heian period Japan held (or were portrayed by Shingon adherents as holding) that attaining Buddhahood is possible but requires a huge amount of time (three incalculable aeons) of practice to achieve, whereas esoteric Buddhism teaches that Buddhahood can be attained in this lifetime by anyone.

Kūkai held, along with the Chinese  and the Tendai schools, that all phenomena could be expressed as 'letters' in a 'World-Text'. Mantra, mudra, and mandala are special because they constitute the 'language' through which the Dharmakāya (i.e. Reality itself) communicates. Although portrayed through the use of anthropomorphic metaphors, Shingon does not see the Dharmakaya Buddha as a separate entity standing apart from the universe. Instead, the deity is the universe properly understood: the union of emptiness, Buddha nature, and all phenomena. Kūkai wrote that "the great Self embraces in itself each and all existences".

Mahavairocana Tathagata 

In Shingon, Mahavairocana Tathagata is the universal or Adi-Buddha that is the basis of all phenomena, present in each and all of them, and not existing independently or externally to them. The goal of Shingon is the realization that one's nature is identical with Mahavairocana, a goal that is achieved through initiation, meditation and esoteric ritual practices. This realization depends on receiving the secret doctrines of Shingon, transmitted orally to initiates by the school's masters. The "Three Mysteries" of body, speech, and mind participate simultaneously in the subsequent process of revealing one's nature: the body through devotional gestures (mudra) and the use of ritual instruments, speech through sacred formulas (mantra), and mind through meditation.

The Thirteen Buddhas

 Wisdom King Acala (Fudō Myōō )
 Gautama Buddha (Shaka-Nyorai )
 Mañjuśrī Bodhisattva (Monju-Bosatsu )
 Samantabhadra Bodhisattva (Fugen-Bosatsu )
 Kṣitigarbha Bodhisattva (Jizō-Bosatsu )
 Maitreya Bodhisattva (Miroku-Bosatsu )
 Bhaiṣajyaguru Buddha (Yakushi-Nyorai )
 Avalokiteśvara Bodhisattva (Kannon-Bosatsu )
 Mahāsthāmaprāpta Bodhisattva (Seishi-Bosatsu )
 Amitābha Buddha (Amida-Nyorai )
 Akṣobhya Buddha (Ashuku-Nyorai )
 Mahavairocana Buddha (Dainichi-Nyorai )
 Ākāśagarbha Bodhisattva (Kokūzō-Bosatsu )

Mahavairocana is the Universal Principle which underlies all Buddhist teachings, according to Shingon Buddhism, so other Buddhist figures can be thought of as manifestations with certain roles and attributes. Kūkai wrote that "the great Self is one, yet can be many". Each Buddhist figure is symbolized by its own Sanskrit "seed" letter.

Practice

Elements of Shingon practice 
One feature that Shingon shares in common with other forms of Vajrayana Buddhism, is the use of bīja or seed-syllables in Sanskrit written in the Siddhaṃ alphabet along with anthropomorphic and symbolic representations to express Buddhist deities in their mandalas.

The Siddhaṃ alphabet (Shittan , Bonji ) is used to write mantras. A core meditative practice of Shingon is Ajikan "meditating on the letter a" written using the Siddhaṃ alphabet. The letter A is an important symbol in Mahayana and esoteric Buddhism, which signifies the Dharmakaya, the Buddha Vairocana and non-arising.

Other Shingon meditations include: 
 Gachirinkan ("Full Moon visualization"),
 Gojigonjingan ("Visualization of the Five Elements arrayed in The Body" from the Mahavairocana Tantra) 
 Gosōjōjingan (Pañcābhisaṃbodhi "Series of Five Meditations to attain Buddhahood") from the Vajraśekhara Sutra.

The use of mandalas for contemplation is also another key feature of Shingon practice. The most important mandalas are the Womb or Matrix (taizo) Mandala based on the Mahavairocana Sutra and the Vajra (kongokai) Mandala based on the Vajrasekhara Sutra.

There are four types of mandalas in Shingon:

 Mahāmaṇḍala (Large Mandala)
 Bīja- or Dharmamaṇḍala
 Samayamaṇḍala, representations of the vows of the deities in the form of articles they hold or their mudras
 Karmamaṇḍala representing the activities of the deities in the three-dimensional form of statues, etc.

The essence of Shingon practice is to experience Reality by emulating the inner realization of the Dharmakaya through the meditative ritual use of mantra, mudra and visualization, i.e. "The Three Mysteries" (Sanmitsu ). All Shingon followers gradually develop a teacher-student relationship, formal or informal, whereby a teacher learns the disposition of the student and teaches practices accordingly. For lay practitioners, there is no initiation ceremony beyond the Kechien Kanjō, which aims to help create the bond between the follower and Mahavairocana Buddha. It is normally offered only at Mount Kōya twice a year, but it can also be offered by larger temples under masters permitted to transmit the abhiseka. It is not required for all laypersons to take, and no assigned practices are given.

Discipline 

In the case of disciples wishing to train to become a Shingon ācārya or "teacher" (Ajari , from  ), it requires a period of academic study and religious discipline, or formal training in a temple for a longer period of time, after having already received novice ordination and monastic precepts, and full completion of the rigorous four-fold preliminary training and retreat known as Shido Kegyō. Only then can the practitioner be able to undergo steps for training, examination, and finally abhiṣeka to be certified as a Shingon acarya and continue to study more advanced practices.

In either case, the stress is on finding a qualified and willing mentor who will guide the practitioner through the practice at a gradual pace. An acharya in Shingon is a committed and experienced teacher who is authorized to guide and teach practitioners. One must be an acharya for a number of years at least before one can request to be tested at Mount Kōya for the possibility to qualify as a mahācārya or "great teacher" (Dento Dai-Ajari ), the highest rank of Shingon practice and a qualified grand master. However, it should be noticed that such a tradition is only in Koyasan sect. In other shingon sects, an Ajari who gives Kanjo is only called a Dai-Ajari or a Dento Dai-Ajari and has no special meaning like Koyasan sect. In the first place, Koyasan's Dharma Lineage became extinct immediately after Kūkai, and the current lineage of Koyasan sect is transplanted from Mandala-ji temple in Kyoto by Meizan (1021–1106). It implies that the tradition to become a Dento Dai-Ajari was created after Meizan, not an original tradition of Shingon. Furthermore, Meizan was not given the deepest teaching, so Yukai (1345–1416), a great scholar at Koyasan, considered Anshoji-Ryu Lineage, rather than the Chuin-Ryu Lineage, to be the orthodox Shingon lineage.

Apart from the supplication of prayers and reading of sutras, there are mantras and ritualistic meditative techniques that are available for any laypersons to practice on their own under the supervision of an Ajari. However, any esoteric practices require the devotee to undergo abhiṣeka (initiation) (Kanjō ) into each of these practices under the guidance of a qualified acharya before they may begin to learn and practice them. As with all schools of Esoteric Buddhism, great emphasis is placed on initiation and oral transmission of teachings from teacher to student.

Goma fire ritual 

The goma ritual of consecrated fire is unique to Esoteric Buddhism and is the most recognizable ritual defining Shingon among regular Japanese persons today. It stems from the Vedic homa ritual and is performed by qualified priests and acharyas for the benefit of individuals, the state or all sentient beings in general. The consecrated fire is believed to have a powerful cleansing effect spiritually and psychologically. The central deity invoked in this ritual is usually Acala. The ritual is performed for the purpose of destroying detrimental thoughts and desires, and for the making of secular requests and blessings. In most Shingon temples, this ritual is performed daily in the morning or the afternoon. Larger scale ceremonies often include the constant beating of taiko drums and mass chanting of the mantra of Acala by priests and lay practitioners. Flames can sometimes reach a few meters high. The combination of the ritual's visuals and sounds can be trance-inducing.

Adopting the practice from Shingon Buddhism, adherents the syncretic Japanese religion of Shugendō also practice the goma ritual, of which two types are prominent: the saido dai goma and hashiramoto goma rituals.

Secrecy 

Today, there are very few books on Shingon in the West and until the 1940s, not a single book on Shingon had ever been published anywhere in the world, not even in Japan. Since this lineage was brought over to Japan from Tang China over 1100 years ago, its doctrines have always been closely guarded secrets, passed down orally through an initiatic chain and never written down. Throughout the centuries, except for the initiated, most of the Japanese common folk knew little of its secretive doctrines and of the monks of this "Mantra School" except that besides performing the usual priestly duties of prayers, blessings and funeral rites for the public, they practiced only Mikkyō "secret teachings", in stark contrast to all other Buddhist schools, and were called upon to perform mystical rituals that were supposedly able to summon rain, improve harvests, exorcise demons, avert natural disasters, heal the sick and protect the state. The most powerful ones were thought to be able to render entire armies useless.

Even though Tendai also incorporates esoteric teachings in its doctrines, it is still essentially an exoteric Mahayana school. Some exoteric texts are venerated and studied in Shingon as they are the foundation of Mahayana philosophy but the core teachings and texts of Shingon are purely esoteric. From the lack of written material, inaccessibility of its teachings to non-initiates, language barriers and the difficulty of finding qualified teachers outside Japan, Shingon is in all likelihood the most secretive and least understood school of Buddhism in the world.

Pantheon 

A large number of deities of Vedic, Hindu and Indo-Aryan origins have been incorporated into Mahayana Buddhism and this synthesis is especially prominent in Esoteric Buddhism. Many of these deities have vital roles as they are regularly invoked by the practitioner for various rituals and homas/pujas. In fact, it is ironic that the worship of Vedic-era deities, especially Indra (Taishakuten ), the "King of the Heavens," has declined so much in India but is yet so highly revered in Japan that there are probably more temples devoted to him there than there are in India. Chinese Taoist and Japanese Shinto deities were also assimilated into Mahayana Buddhism as deva-class beings. For example, to Chinese Mahayana Buddhists, Indra (synonymous with Śakra) is the Jade Emperor of Taoism. Agni (Katen ), another Vedic deity, is invoked at the start of every Shingon Goma Ritual. The average Japanese person may not know the names Saraswati or Indra but Benzaiten (Saraswati) and Taishakuten (Indra) are household names that every Japanese person knows.

In Orthodox Esoteric Buddhism, divine beings are grouped into six classes.

Buddhas (Butsu )
Bodhisattvas (Bosatsu )
Wisdom Kings or Vidyarajas (Myōō )
Deities or Devas (Ten )
Avatars (Keshin )
Patriarchs (Soshi )

The Five Great Wisdom Kings

The Five Great Wisdom Kings are wrathful manifestations of the Five Dhyani Buddhas.

Acala or Acalanatha (Fudō Myōō ) "The Immovable One" – Manifestation of Buddha Mahavairocana
Amrtakundalin (Gundari Myōō ) "The Dispenser of Heavenly Nectar" – Manifestation of Buddha Ratnasambhava
Trailokyavijaya (Gōzanze Myōō ) "The Conqueror of The Three Planes" – Manifestation of Buddha Akshobhya
Yamāntaka (Daiitoku Myōō ) "The Defeater of Death" – Manifestation of Buddha Amitabha
Vajrayaksa (Kongō Yasha Myōō ) "The Devourer of Demons" – Manifestation of Buddha Amoghasiddhi

Other well-known Wisdom Kings

Ragaraja (Aizen Myōō )
Mahamayuri (Kujaku Myōō )
Hayagriva (Batō Kannon )
Ucchusma (Ususama Myōō )
Atavaka (Daigensui Myōō )

The Twelve Guardian Deities (Deva)

Agni (Katen ) – Lord of Fire; Guardian of the South East
Brahmā (Bonten ) – Lord of the Heavens; Guardian of the Heavens (upward direction)
Chandra (Gatten ) – Lord of the Moon
Indra (Taishakuten ) – Lord of the Trāyastriṃśa Heaven and The Thirty Three Devas; Guardian of the East
Prthivi or Bhūmī-Devī (Jiten ) – Lord of the Earth; Guardian of the Earth (downward direction)
Rakshasa (Rasetsuten ) – Lord of Demons; Guardian of the South West (converted Buddhist rakshasas)
Shiva or Maheshvara (Daijizaiten  or Ishanaten ) – Lord of The Desire Realms; Guardian of the North East
Sūrya (Nitten ) – Lord of the Sun
Vaishravana (Bishamonten  or Tamonten ) – Lord of Wealth; Guardian of the North
Varuṇa (Suiten ) – Lord of Water; Guardian of the West
Vāyu (Fūten )- Lord of Wind; Guardian of the North West
Yama (Emmaten ) – Lord of the Underworld; Guardian of the South

Other Important Deities (Deva)

Marici (Marishi-Ten ) – Patron deity of Warriors
Mahakala (Daikokuten ) – Patron deity of Wealth
Saraswati (Benzaiten ) – Patron deity of Knowledge, Art and Music
Ganesha (Kangiten ) Patron deity of Bliss and Remover of Obstacles
Skanda (Idaten  or Kumaraten ) Protector of Buddhist Monasteries and Monks

Branches 

The Orthodox (Kogi) Shingon School
Kōyasan
Chuin-Ryu Lineage
Nishinoin-Ryu Nozen-Gata Kōya-Sojo Lineage (already extinct)
Nishinoin-Ryu Genyu-Gata Kōya-Sojo Lineage (already extinct)
Nishinoin-Ryu Enyu-Gata Kōya-Sojo Lineage (already extinct)
Samboin-Ryu Kenjin-Gata Kōya-Sojo Lineage (almost extinct)
Samboin-Ryu Ikyo-Gata Kōya-Sojo Lineage (almost extinct)
Samboin-Ryu Shingen-Gata Kōya-Sojo Lineage (almost extinct)
Anshoji-Ryu Lineage (almost extinct)
Chuinhon-Ryu Lineage (almost extinct)
Jimyoin-Ryu Lineage (almost extinct)
Reiunji-ha
Shinanshoji-Ryu Lineage (established by Jogon (1639 - 1702))
Zentsūji-ha
Jizoin-Ryu Lineage (already extinct)
Zuishinin-Ryu Lineage (since Meiji era)
Daigo-ha
Samboin-Ryu Jozei-Gata Lineage
Samboin-Ryu Kenjin-Gata Lineage (already extinct)
Rishoin-Ryu Lineage (already extinct)
Kongoouin-Ryu Lineage (already extinct)
Jizoin-Ryu Lineage (already extinct)
Omuro-ha
Nishinoin-Ryu Enyu-Gata Lineage
Shingon-Ritsu
Saidaiji-Ryu Lineage (already extinct) 
Chuin-Ryu Lineage (same as Kōyasan)
Daikakuji-ha
Samboin-Ryu Kenjin-Gata Lineage (already extinct)
Hojuin-Ryu Lineage (since Heisei era)
Sennyūji-ha
Zuishinin-Ryu Lineage
Yamashina-ha
Kanshuji-Ryu Lineage
Shigisan
Chuin-Ryu Lineage （, same as Kōyasan）
Nakayamadera-ha
Chuin-Ryu Lineage (same as Kōyasan)
Sanbōshū
Chuin-Ryu Lineage (same as Kōyasan)
Sumadera-ha
Chuin-Ryu Lineage (same as Kōyasan)
Tōji-ha
Nishinoin-Ryu Nozen-Gata Lineage
The Reformed (Shingi) Shingon School
Shingon-shu Negoroji
Chushoin-Ryu Lineage
Chizan-ha
Chushoin-Ryu Lineage
Samboin-Ryu Nisshu-Sojo
Buzan-ha
Samboin-Ryu Kenjin-Gata Lineage (already extinct)
Chushoin-Ryu Lineage
Daidenboin-Ryu Lineage (since Meiji era)
Kokubunji-ha
Inunaki-ha

See also 

 Chinese Buddhism
 Tangmi
 Religion in Asia
 Religion in Japan
 Sokushinbutsu
 Shinjō Itō
 Shinnyo-en
 Tachikawa-ryu

References

Bibliography 

 Giebel, Rolf W.; Todaro, Dale A.; transl. (2004). Shingon Texts, Berkeley, Calif.: Numata Center for Buddhist Translation and Research. 
 Giebel, Rolf, transl. (2006), The Vairocanābhisaṃbodhi Sutra, Numata Center for Buddhist Translation and Research, Berkeley, 
 Giebel, Rolf, transl. (2006). Two Esoteric Sutras: The Adamantine Pinnacle Sutra (T 18, no 865), The Susiddhikara Sutra (T 18, no 893), Berkeley: Numata Center for Buddhist Translation and Research. 
 Hakeda, Yoshito S., transl. (1972). Kukai: Major Works, Translated, With an Account of His Life and a Study of His Thought, New York: Columbia University Press, .
 Matsunaga, Daigan; and Matsunaga, Alicia (1974). Foundation of Japanese Buddhism, Vol. I: The Aristocratic Age. Buddhist Books International, Los Angeles und Tokio. .
 Kiyota, Minoru (1978). Shingon Buddhism: Theory and Practice. Los Angeles/Tokyo: Buddhist Books International.
 Payne, Richard K. (2004). "Ritual Syntax and Cognitive Theory", Pacific World Journal, Third Series, No 6, 105–227. 
 Toki, Hôryû; Kawamura, Seiichi, tr, (1899). "Si-do-in-dzou; gestes de l'officiant dans les cérémonies mystiques des sectes Tendaï et Singon", Paris, E. Leroux.
 Yamasaki, Taiko (1988). Shingon: Japanese Esoteric Buddhism, Boston/London: Shambala Publications.
 Miyata, Taisen (1998). A Study of the Ritual Mudras in the Shingon Tradition and Their Symbolism.
 Dreitlein, Eijo (2011). Shido Kegyo Shidai, Japan. 
 Dreitlein, Eijo (2011). Beginner's Handbook for the Shido Kegyo of Chuin-ryu, Japan. 
 Maeda, Shuwa (2019). The Ritual Books of Four Preliminary Practices: Sambo-in Lineage Kenjin School, Japan.
 Chandra, Lokesh (2003). The Esoteric Iconography of Japanese Mandalas, International Academy of Indian Culture and Aditya Prakashan, New Delhi, 
 Arai, Yusei (1997). Koyasan Shingon Buddhism: A Handbook for Followers, Japan: Koyasan Shingon Mission, .

External links 

 Koyasan Shingon Sect Main Temple Kongobu-ji
 Ninna-ji Temple
 Daigo-ji Temple
 Chishakuin Temple
 Negoro-ji Temple
 Daikaku-ji Temple
 Chogosonshi-ji Temple
 Gokoku-ji Temple

 
Schools of Buddhism founded in Japan
Articles containing video clips
Kūkai
Buddhism in the Heian period